Edward Francis Winslow (September 28, 1837 – October 22, 1914) was an officer in the Union Army during the American Civil War and later railroad executive.

Biography

Early life
Winslow was born September 28, 1837 in Augusta, Maine.  In 1856 moved to Mount Pleasant, Iowa where he engaged in the mercantile business until the fall of 1861 when he enlisted into the 4th Regiment Iowa Volunteer Cavalry.  After the war he began his longtime career in the railroad industry as a railroad executive.

Civil War
When the Civil War began Winslow enlisted in the 4th Regiment Iowa Volunteer Cavalry as Captain of Company F.  He was promoted to Major in 1863 and was wounded in a minor engagement at Twelve Mile Creek, Mississippi.  He then participated in the siege of Vicksburg where he was posted to the rear of the siege lines to protect the army from Joseph E. Johnston's Confederate forces near Jackson, Mississippi.  Here, Winslow was again wounded in a small cavalry action at Mechanicsburg, Mississippi. On July 4, 1863 he became colonel of his regiment.  For the next year he commanded cavalry brigades in the Department of the Tennessee being engaged in the battles of Meridian, Brice's Crossroads and Tupelo.  In October, 1864 he commanded the 4th Brigade in Alfred Pleasonton's cavalry division during Price's Missouri Raid.  He was wounded at the Battle of Westport and command of his brigade passed to Frederick Benteen.  A few days later he returned to the field in command of a brigade in James H. Wilson's cavalry corps and fought at the battles of Selma and Columbus.  After Union troops seized Columbus, he was placed in command of the city, where he led the destruction of the ironclad ram CSS Jackson (CSS Muscogee) as well as the arsenal, the armory, and many factories. Winslow received a brevet promotion to brigadier general, dated December 12, 1864.  He was discharged from service on August 10, 1865.

Railroad Executive
After the war Winslow continued his railroad career.  He served as executive for the St. Louis & Southern Railroad, the Burlington, Cedar Rapids and Northern Railroad, the New York, Ontario and Western Railway, the Manhattan Elevated Railway, the St. Louis and Southwestern Railway, executive of the Atlantic and Pacific Railroad.  Edward Winslow died on October 22, 1914 in Canandaigua, New York.

References
 Civil War Notebook
 Eicher, John H., & Eicher, David J., Civil War High Commands, Stanford University Press, 2001, .

Union Army colonels
19th-century American railroad executives
1837 births
1914 deaths